is a senior high school in Japan, located in Saitama Prefecture. It was founded in 1982 as a high school attached to Waseda University.

History
The school was founded in April 1982 as a "100th anniversary memorial project of Waseda University". The school was founded as a boys' school, but it converted to a coeducational school in April 2007.

Present
The school has continued interactions with prestige high schools as below.
Affiliated High School of Peking University （）
National Taichung First Senior High School （）
National Junior College （）
Anyang Foreign Language High School （）
SMA Negeri 2 Yogyakarta （）

According to the Hensachi (the indication showing the entrance difficulties by prep schools) rankings published by Sundai-Yobiko （駿台予備校）, the school is one of the most selective senior high schools in Japan. Its entrance difficulty is usually considered as the top ranked among senior high schools in Saitama Prefacture.

Location/facility

The closest station is the Honjō-Waseda Station.

Notable alumni
 Gyochi Yoshida - Conductor of Nagoya Philharmonic Orchestra
 Yoshio Tezuka - Special Advisor to the Prime Minister (Noda cabinet)
Masafumi Kawaguchi -  American football player
 Rena Ichiki (ja, zh) - Former pop singer, currently known as an announcer at Nippon TV
 Shiori Nakamata (ja, zh, ko) - Former pop singer
 Iwao Hirose - philosopher
 Takeharu Yamanaka - politician
 Masafumi Kawaguchi - former American football player
 Ken'ichi Arai - member of Rag Fair

Related books
 早稲田大学本庄高等学院編『二十五周年記念誌 : 継承と発展』(Japanese), published in 2007
 早稲田大学本庄高等学院編『三十周年記念誌』(Japanese), published in 2012

References

External links

 Waseda University Honjo Senior High School

High schools in Saitama Prefecture
Educational institutions established in 1982
Private schools in Japan
Waseda University
1982 establishments in Japan